A River Glimpse is a mid 19th century painting by American artist Thomas Doughty. Done in oil on canvas, the painting depicts a "glimpse" of a river between trees; this is in keeping with Doughty's status as a connective artist between English pastoral painters and the American Hudson River School. The work is in the collection of the Metropolitan Museum of Art.

References 

Paintings in the collection of the Metropolitan Museum of Art